CS Sportul Studenţesc Bucharest is an ice hockey team in Bucharest, Romania. They participate in the Romanian Hockey League, the top level of ice hockey in Romania.

The club was founded in 1916.

External links
Official website

Ice hockey teams in Romania
Sports clubs in Bucharest
FC Sportul Studențesc București
1966 establishments in Romania
Ice hockey clubs established in 1966